Rosenburg-Mold is a town in the district of Horn in Lower Austria, Austria. The Renaissance castle Rosenburg is located in the town.

Population

References

External links 

Cities and towns in Horn District